Chase Mallory Cartwright (born August 6, 1992) is an American football coach who is currently the Head Coach at San Tan Charter School. He played college football at Northern Arizona University and attended Corona del Sol High School in Tempe, Arizona. He has also been a member of the Orlando Predators and Arizona Rattlers. Cartwright is formerly a graduate assistant in academic services for the Redhawks of Southeast Missouri State University.

Early life

College career
Cartwright played for the Northern Arizona Lumberjacks from 2010 to 2014. He was the team's starter his final three years and helped the Lumberjacks to 24 wins. He played in 19 games during his career, including 11 starts.

Statistics

Source:

Professional career
In May 2015, Cartwright was one of three quarterbacks who attended rookie minicamp with the Chicago Bears.

Orlando Predators
Cartwright was assigned to the Orlando Predators of the Arena Football League for the 2016 season on March 23, 2016. He was placed on injured reserve to begin the season. He was reactivated from injured reserve on June 4, placed on injured reserve again on June 14, reactivated from injure reserve on June 23 and placed on injured reserve on July 7, 2016. Cartwright played in two games in 2016, completing one of two passes for eight yards.

Arizona Rattlers
In October 2016, Cartwright was selected by the Arizona Rattlers during a dispersal draft.

Baltimore Brigade
Cartwright was assigned to the Baltimore Brigade on January 30, 2017. He started the Brigade's first game of the season against the Washington Valor but was replaced by Shane Carden in the second quarter. Cartwright completed two of seven passes for 13 yards and one interception in the game.

Coaching career

San Tan Charter School Roadrunners
In December 2021, it was reported that Cartwright would be promoted to Head Football Coach of the San Tan Charter School after a season as Quarterbacks Coach. He joined the San Tan Charter school after leaving the Wagner Seahawks football team as the Quarterbacks coach.

Statistics

Stats from ArenaFan:

References

External links
Northern Arizona Lumberjacks profile

Living people
1992 births
Players of American football from Arizona
American football quarterbacks
Northern Arizona Lumberjacks football players
Orlando Predators players
Baltimore Brigade players
Arizona Rattlers players